Știința Petroșani is a Romanian rugby union club currently playing in the Liga Națională de Rugby. It was founded in 1948 and won the Romanian Cup in 1983, 1991 and 1993.

Honours
Cupa României
Winners (5): 1983, 1991, 1993

Current squad
In the 2022 edition of the Liga Națională de Rugby, the current squad is as follows:

References

External links
Liga Nationala Rugby link

Romanian rugby union teams